Roger Ashton-Griffiths (born 19 January 1957) is an English character actor, screenwriter and film director. He is best known for his role as Mace Tyrell in the HBO fantasy series Game of Thrones.

Life and career

Born in Hertfordshire, Ashton-Griffiths attended Altrincham Grammar School for Boys in Manchester. He then read music at Lancaster University, where he was a member of Furness College, graduating in 1978. He began his career as a singer with the English National Opera at the London Coliseum between 1979 and 1981.

He has appeared in numerous high-profile films, including Terry Gilliam's Brazil (1985) and The Brothers Grimm (2005), Dreamchild (1985), Young Sherlock Holmes (1985), Gene Wilder's Haunted Honeymoon (1986), Roman Polanski's Pirates (1986), Peter Greenaway's The Cook, the Thief, His Wife & Her Lover (1989), Mountains of the Moon (1990), Chicago Joe and the Showgirl (1990), Shadowlands (1993), The Portrait of a Lady (1996), The Wind in the Willows (1996), A Knight's Tale (2001), Martin Scorsese's Gangs of New York (2002), Woody Allen's You Will Meet a Tall Dark Stranger (2010), Olivier Dahan's Grace of Monaco (2014) and Mike Leigh's Mr. Turner (2014).

He has also worked extensively in television, including Jack the Ripper, The Odyssey, Merlin, Margaret, The Tudors, Doctor Who, Coronation Street and Father Brown. He portrays Lord Mace Tyrell in Game of Thrones in Season 4, Season 5, and Season 6.

Personal life
Ashton-Griffiths is married to Sharmini Thillaimuthu, a BBC studio manager, with whom he has two children. He lives in Suffolk, and possesses dual British and Canadian citizenship.

In 2003, Ashton-Griffiths attained an MA in fine art from the University of East London, and in 2016, he attained a PhD in creative writing from the University of East Anglia after six years of study. In 2010, he was appointed a Fellow of Furness College, Lancaster, his alma mater.

Filmography

Film

Television

References

External links

Alumni of the Lancaster University

Living people
1957 births
Alumni of Lancaster University
Alumni of Furness College, Lancaster
Alumni of the University of East London
Alumni of the University of East Anglia
English male film actors
English male television actors
English people of Canadian descent
Male actors from Hertfordshire
People educated at Altrincham Grammar School for Boys
20th-century English male actors
21st-century English male actors
English screenwriters
English male screenwriters
English film directors
English opera singers